La Fiebre del Loco (The Abalone Fever in Spanish) is a 2001 Chilean comedy directed by Andres Wood. The film's tagline was "Amor y avaricia en un mundo de buzos y moluscos" (Spanish for: Love and greed in a world of scuba and mollusks).

Plot
The film centers on the conflicts between visiting prostitutes and fishermen's wives in a small fishing village in rural Southern Chile. The village has become obsessed with Chilean abalone (known as "loco" in Spanish, which has a dual meaning of both abalone and craziness). Chaos erupts when the Chilean government temporarily lifts the ban on the collection of this prized mollusk, which is believed to have aphrodisiacal effects.

Cast
Emilio Bardi - Canuto
Luis Dubó - Jorge
Loreto Moyo - Sonia
Luis Margani - Padre Luis (Father Luis)
Tamara Acosta - Nelly
María Izquierdo - Leila
Mariana Loyola - Paty
Patricia López (credited as Patricia López Menadier) - Isabel
Carmina Riego
Pilar Zderich - Denisse
Aldo Parodi
Julio Marcone - Yukio
Cristián Chaparro
Gabriela Medina
Carmen Barros
Marcela Arroyave
Claudia Hidalgo
Chamila Rodríguez
Pablo Striano
Camila Videla

Technical information

Realization and demonstration, on October 29, 2001, of the first digital cinema transmission by satellite in Europe of a feature film (La Fiebre del Loco) by Bernard Pauchon, Alain Lorentz, Raymond Melwig and Philippe Binant.

References

External links 
 

2001 comedy films
2001 films
Chilean comedy films
Films directed by Andrés Wood
Films produced by Agustín Almodóvar